Since the early 2000s, a number of proposals have been made by politicians and interest groups in Cork City, Ireland to introduce a light rail system in the city. As of early 2019 it was in a period of public consultation. The proposal has been compared to the Luas light rail system in Dublin.

History
From the 1880s to 1934, a light rail system existed in Cork, the Cork and Muskerry Light Railway. It closed in 1934, having sustained damage during the Irish Civil War, which hindered usage. Another tramway operated three lines around the city center and surrounding suburbs, operated by the Cork Electric Tramways and Lighting Company. It closed in 1931, having sustained damage during the Burning of Cork, as well as the increased use of motor transportation.

A light rail system was proposed as part of the Green Party manifesto in 2007. The Green Party entered as the junior partner into a coalition with Fianna Fáil after the 2007 general election. The proposals were briefly discussed in the Dáil. However, the post-2008 economic downturn began shortly afterward, and it, along with other infrastructural plans, were shelved.

The proposal was mentioned in the government's Ireland 2040 framework, which was published in 2018. As of 2019, a formal transportation plan for Cork, known as the Cork Metropolitan Area Transport Strategy (CMATS), was prepared by the local authority. Publication was scheduled for February 2018, with a "draft plan" proposed to be available for "public consultation early in 2019". The draft CMATS plan was published in May 2019, and included draft proposals for the construction of a light-rail system sometime after 2031.

The proposed light-rail system received support from the president of UCC, Cork's largest third-level institution, and the Cork Chamber of Commerce, and Tánaiste Simon Coveney and former Lord Mayor Mary Shields.

Proposed route
Plans proposed in 2017, under the Ireland 2040 development framework, had suggested an 'east-west' light-rail corridor from Ballincollig in the west of Cork City, through the city centre, to Mahon in the east. A 'north-south' corridor was also contained in these plans, linking Cork Airport.

During 2018, the People Before Profit (PBP) political party proposed a variant of these routes. One two-line proposal suggested one line running from Ballincollig to Mahon, and another from Cork Airport to Cork city center. Another PBP proposal, from later in 2018, was based on three lines.

In May 2019, the 'Cork Metropolitan Area Transport Strategy' was published by the National Transport Authority, and contained proposals for a one-line system running from Ballincollig to Mahon through the city centre. The project was unveiled alongside a number of other suggested transport investments, including an expansion of the Cork Suburban Rail. The 2019 proposal was costed at €1 billion, projected to include 25 possible stops along 17 km of track. Determination of the final LRT route alignment was due to start in early 2020 with construction not expected to commence "until 2031 at earliest". Starting in Ballincollig, the line proposed for this project proposed a route eastwards, serving locations such as Cork Institute of Technology, Cork University Hospital, University College Cork, Patrick street, Kent station, Páirc Uí Chaoimh and Mahon Point Shopping Centre. These 2019 proposals speculated that the line would make use of the old Cork, Blackrock and Passage Railway line greenway when running through Blackrock.

A cycleway and improved suburban rail network was announced with plans for a light rail in July 2020.

References

External links
 Cork Metropolitan Area Transport Strategy, National Transport Authority

Light rail in Ireland
Tram transport in the Republic of Ireland
Transport in Cork (city)
Proposed railway lines in the Republic of Ireland